Theo Smit (born 5 April 1951 in Amsterdam) is a retired Dutch professional road bicycle racer.

Major results

1974
Ronde van Noord-Holland
1975
Belsele
Tour de France:
Winner stages 5 and 9A
1976
 National 50 km Track Championship
Vuelta a España:
Winner stages 3 and 5
1977
Aalsmeer
Obbicht
1978
Vlissingen
1980
Alkmaar
 National Sprint Track Championship
Alphen aan de Rijn
Rijen
1981
Bodegraven
IJsselstein
Limbrecht
1982
Zes van Rijn & Gouwe
Profronde van Stiphout
Ede
Dongen
1983
Aalsmeer
 National Team Time Trial Championship D
Profronde van Wierden
Ulvenhout
Waddinxveen
Kampen
1984
Kamerik
 National Track Points race Championship
Ronde van Gouda
Zes van Rijn & Gouwe
1985
Langedijk
 National Track Keirin Championship
1986
Profronde van Surhuisterveen
Kampen

External links 

Official Tour de France results for Theo Smit

1951 births
Living people
Dutch male cyclists
Dutch Tour de France stage winners
Dutch Vuelta a España stage winners
Dutch track cyclists
Cyclists from Amsterdam